Jaromír Holub (born 17 December 1954) is a Czech fencer. He competed in the team épée event at the 1980 Summer Olympics.

References

External links
 

1954 births
Living people
People from Mariánské Lázně
Czech male fencers
Czechoslovak male fencers
Olympic fencers of Czechoslovakia
Fencers at the 1980 Summer Olympics
Sportspeople from the Karlovy Vary Region